The John Hobson House is a house located in Astoria, Oregon, listed on the National Register of Historic Places.  It was built in 1863.

See also
 National Register of Historic Places listings in Clatsop County, Oregon

References

1863 establishments in Oregon
Houses completed in 1863
Houses on the National Register of Historic Places in Astoria, Oregon
Stick-Eastlake architecture in Oregon